The Berlin Borough School District is a community public school district that serves students in pre-kindergarten through eighth grade from Berlin Borough, in Camden County, New Jersey, United States.

As of the 2021–22 school year, the district, comprised of one school, had an enrollment of 802 students and 73.6 classroom teachers (on an FTE basis), for a student–teacher ratio of 10.9:1.

The district is classified by the New Jersey Department of Education as being in District Factor Group "DE", the fifth-highest of eight groupings. District Factor Groups organize districts statewide to allow comparison by common socioeconomic characteristics of the local districts. From lowest socioeconomic status to highest, the categories are A, B, CD, DE, FG, GH, I and J.

Public school students in ninth through twelfth grades attend the Eastern Camden County Regional High School District, a limited-purpose, public regional school district that serves students at Eastern Regional High School from the constituent communities of Berlin Borough, Gibbsboro and Voorhees Township. As of the 2021–22 school year, the high school had an enrollment of 1,998 students and 137.0 classroom teachers (on an FTE basis), for a student–teacher ratio of 14.6:1.

Awards and recognition
The New Jersey Alliance for Social, Emotional and Character Development (NJASECD) recognized Berlin Community School as 2012 New Jersey School of Character (NJSOC) - honorable mention.

The district was selected as one of the top "100 Best Communities for Music Education in America 2005" by the American Music Conference.

Schools
Berlin Community School serves grades PreK-8. The school served a total of 803 students in grades PreK-8 as of the 2021–22 school year.
Kellilyn Mawson, Elementary School Principal
Therese Bonmati, Middle School Principal

Former schools
 In 1948, during de jure educational segregation in the United States, the district had a school for black children with an outdoor pump and restrooms and two indoor rooms. Noma Jensen of The Journal of Negro Education described the school as being "in bad physical conditions".

Administration
Core members of the district's administration are:
Dr. Joseph Campisi, Superintendent
Donna DiLapo, Business Administrator and Board Secretary

Board of education
The district's board of education is comprised of nine members who set policy and oversee the fiscal and educational operation of the district through its administration. As a Type II school district, the board's trustees are elected directly by voters to serve three-year terms of office on a staggered basis, with three seats up for election each year held (since 2012) as part of the November general election. The board appoints a superintendent to oversee the district's day-to-day operations and a business administrator to supervise the business functions of the district.

References

External links
Berlin Community School

School Data for the Berlin Community School, National Center for Education Statistics
Eastern Camden County Regional High School District

Berlin, New Jersey
New Jersey District Factor Group DE
School districts in Camden County, New Jersey